Thronecast is a British television series which aired on Sky Atlantic between 2011 and 2019. From the fifth series onwards, the show was presented by Sue Perkins and Jamie East. It is an aftershow to Game of Thrones, which also aired on the channel in the United Kingdom. Each episode varied between 10 minutes and 60 minutes in length and featured interviews with cast and crew members, interaction with the audience through social media, and analysis of the episode, along with a preview of the next episode of Game of Thrones. It was the only official aftershow for the series until HBO aired After the Thrones in 2016, providing an aftershow to the show's sixth series until it was cancelled after ten episodes.

Thronecast was originally devised by executive producers Ruby Thomas, Ben Boyer and Koink Productions Ltd for Sky Digital Entertainment. The series began airing online in April 2011 as a series of 10-minute podcasts presented by Geoff Lloyd to correspond with the first series of Game of Thrones. Annabel Port joined Geoff for the second series, which corresponded with the broadcast of the second series of Game of Thrones. For the third series, Thronecast became a 15-minute on-air show that was broadcast on Sky Atlantic following each episode of the third series of Game of Thrones, and featured new guest presenter Grace Dent. The fourth series was presented by Jamie East and Rachel Parris, and was 30 minutes long. The fifth series was presented by Sue Perkins and Jamie East and was 30 minutes long, except for the series finale which was an extended hour long special. Perkins and East continued to present the seventh and eighth series of the show which were all 60 minutes long with the exception of the final episode of the show, which was 70 minutes. Series 7 and 8 included pre-series episodes titled War Room, and the eighth series also included a 90 minutes long gameshow titled Gameshow of Thrones and a 30-minute pre-finale episode titled Thronecast: The End is Coming.

Each series was also made available on Sky Go, On Demand (previously Sky Anytime and Sky Anytime+) and NOW TV. Series 1 to 4 of Thronecast were produced by Koink Productions Ltd for Sky Atlantic. Series 5 of Thronecast was produced by CPL Productions for Sky Atlantic. Series 6 and 7 of the show were produced by Sky's in-house production company, Sky Vision Productions. Series 8 of the show was produced by independent production company Znak & Co Ltd.

Cast
 Geoff Lloyd (seasons 1–3)
 Annabel Port (seasons 2–3)
 Grace Dent (season 3)
 Jamie East (seasons 4–8)
 Rachel Parris (season 4)
 Sue Perkins (seasons 5–8)

Episodes

Series overview

Series 1 (2011)

Series 2 (2012)
An extended special episode of Thronecast was filmed before the start of the second series, which featured interviews with Emilia Clarke (Daenerys Targaryen), Alfie Allen (Theon Greyjoy), Michelle Fairley (Catelyn Stark), Kit Harington (Jon Snow), Charles Dance (Tywin Lannister), Liam Cunningham (Davos Seaworth), and Nikolaj Coster-Waldau (Jaime Lannister).

Series 3 (2013)

Series 4 (2014)

Series 5 (2015)
The series finale was an extended one-hour episode and was viewed by 560,000 viewers, making it the second highest-rated broadcast that week, behind the actual episode. It also received 29,000 timeshifted viewers.

Series 6 (2016)
The series finale was an extended one-hour episode and was viewed by 587,000 viewers, making it the second highest-rated broadcast that week, behind the actual episode. It also received 45,000 timeshifted viewers.

Series 7 (2017)
A pre-series multi-parter episode titled "War Room", filmed on location, was broadcast the week before the start of Series 7.

Series 8 (2019)

Two specials aired before Series 8: "Gameshow of Thrones" featuring a number of stars of the show with superfans, plus "War Room" featuring superfans Al Murray, Lauren Laverne and Jonathan Ross.

The series finale includes a special 30-minute pre-show episode titled "The End is Coming", and a 70-minute post-show episode. These episodes incorporated an additional studio segment titled "Littlefinger's Establishment", where Jamie East talked to stars of the show and superfans about their memories of working on the show.

Episode 3 of Series 8 was the most viewed episode of Thronecast according to BARB figures.

See also
After the Thrones – a similar talk show hosted by Andy Greenwald and Chris Ryan which also discusses episodes of Game of Thrones.
Talking Dead – a similar talk show hosted by Chris Hardwick which discusses episodes of The Walking Dead and Fear the Walking Dead.
Talking Bad – a similar talk show hosted by Hardwick which discussed episodes of Breaking Bads fifth series.
Talking Saul – a similar talk show hosted by Hardwick which discusses episodes of Better Call Saul.
Talking Preacher – a similar talk show hosted by Hardwick which discusses episodes of Preacher.

References

External links

Official Thronecast website at Sky Atlantic
Official Game of Thrones website at Sky Atlantic
Sue Perkins Twitter
Jamie East
CPL Productions
Koink Productions Ltd

Game of Thrones
Sky Atlantic original programming
2011 British television series debuts
2019 British television series endings
2010s British television talk shows
Aftershows
Television series by Sony Pictures Television
English-language television shows